Route 265 is a two-lane north/south highway on the south shore of the Saint Lawrence River in Quebec, Canada. Its northern terminus is in Deschaillons-sur-Saint-Laurent at the junction of Route 132, and the southern terminus is at the junction of Route 165 in Plessisville. It used to continue up to Black Lake (now part of Thetford Mines) at the junction of Route 112, but the segment between Plessisville and Black Lake was later re-numbered to Route 165 in the 1990s.

Towns along Route 265
 Deschaillons-sur-Saint-Laurent
 Parisville
 Fortierville
 Sainte-Françoise
 Villeroy
 Notre-Dame-de-Lourdes
 Plessisville

See also
 List of Quebec provincial highways

References

External links 
 Route 265 on Google Maps
 Provincial Route Map (Courtesy of the Quebec Ministry of Transportation) 

265